Spruce Mountain is a mountain located in the Catskill Mountains of New York northeast of Frost Valley. Hemlock Mountain is located southeast and Panther Mountain is located northeast of Spruce Mountain.

References

Mountains of Ulster County, New York
Mountains of New York (state)